Programa de Controle da Poluição do Ar por Veículos Automotores - PROCONVE (automobiles) and PROMOT (motorcycles) is a division of IBAMA that regulates vehicular emissions in Brazil.

The European emission standards (used in many Latin American countries) are taken as a reference.

Standards for light vehicles are indicated by the letter 'L'. For heavy vehicles, 'P' is used (pesados). A number indicates an increasingly stricter norm for each class. Currently Ln pairs up with Pn+1.

Partial timeline 
From 1 January 2012, all new heavy vehicles in Brazil must comply with Proconve P7 (similar to Euro 5)

From 1 January 2015, all new light vehicles in Brazil must comply with Proconve L6 (similar to Euro 5).

From 1 January 2022, all new light vehicles in Brazil must comply with Proconve L7 (similar to Euro 6).

From 1 January 2023, all new heavy vehicles in Brazil must comply with Proconve P8 (similar to Euro 6).

From 1 January 2025, the new light vehicle fleets in Brazil must comply with the first stage of Proconve L8 (automaker average).

References

Emission standards
Air pollution in Brazil
Standards of Brazil
Environmental law in Brazil